Liptena simplicia, the simple liptena, is a butterfly in the family Lycaenidae. It is found in Guinea, Sierra Leone, Liberia, Ivory Coast, Ghana and western Nigeria. The habitat consists of forests.

Adults have been recorded feeding from extrafloral nectaries of Marantaceae species.

References

Butterflies described in 1887
Liptena
Butterflies of Africa